Putative microRNA host gene 1 protein is a protein that in humans is encoded by the MIR17HG gene.

References

Further reading

Biology of bipolar disorder